Galphimia gracilis, a species in the genus Galphimia of the family Malpighiaceae, is native to eastern Mexico. It is widely cultivated in warm regions throughout the world, often under the common names gold shower or shower-of-gold, slender goldshower or sometimes thryallis. In horticultural publications, in the nursery trade, and on websites, this species is commonly but mistakenly referred to as Galphimia glauca, Galphimia brasiliensis, Thryallis glauca, Thryallis gracilis, or often in South America, Thryallis brasiliensis.

Galphimia gracilis is easily told apart from the true G. glauca and G. brasiliensis by the flowers. In G. gracilis the petals fall as the fruit matures; in G. glauca the petals are persistent even in fruit. Pollens are spherical, approximately 16-18 microns in diameter.

External links and reference
Malpighiaceae Malpighiaceae - description, taxonomy, phylogeny, and nomenclature
Galphimia
Thryallis
Anderson, C. 2007. Revision of Galphimia (Malpighiaceae). Contributions from the University of Michigan Herbarium 25: 1–82.

Malpighiaceae